Arthur Earl Bryson Jr. (born October 7, 1925)  is the Paul Pigott Professor of Engineering Emeritus at Stanford University and the "father of modern optimal control theory". With Henry J. Kelley, he also pioneered an early version of the backpropagation procedure,
now widely used for machine learning and artificial neural networks.

He was a member of the U.S. Navy V-12 program at Iowa State College, and received his B.S. in aeronautical engineering there in 1946.  He earned his Ph.D. from the California Institute of Technology, graduating in 1951.  His thesis An Interferometric Wind Tunnel Study of Transonic Flow past Wedge and Circular Arcs was advised by Hans W. Liepmann.

Bryson was the Ph.D. advisor to the Harvard control theorist Yu-Chi Ho.

In 1970, Bryson was elected a member of the National Academy of Engineering for contributions to engineering education and imaginative application of modern statistical methods to engineering optimization.

Awards and honors
He was awarded membership into the National Academy of Engineering in 1970 and the National Academy of Sciences in 1973. He was awarded the IEEE Control Systems Science and Engineering Award in 1984, the Richard E. Bellman Control Heritage Award in 1990 from the American Automatic Control Council and the Daniel Guggenheim Medal in 2009.

References

External links
 Salute to Arthur E. Bryson Jr.

Control theorists
Richard E. Bellman Control Heritage Award recipients
Living people
Stanford University School of Engineering faculty
Members of the United States National Academy of Sciences
Members of the United States National Academy of Engineering
1925 births
United States Navy personnel of World War II
United States Navy officers